101 Shark Pets is a 2010 pet caring simulation video game developed by Teyon for the Nintendo DSiWare.

Gameplay

101 Shark Pets is a simulation of raising a shark. Players look after a shark and keep its statistics as high as possible by taking care of its health and mood, developing its personality, playing games and training it.

Mini-games
The game contains several mini-games such as treasure hunting, chasing a boat, memory, jigsaw and race.

 Memory - a player's task is to find all matching pairs of cards that can be bought in the Pet Shop.
 Treasure hunting - a player uses a stylus to find a way in a bubble water to collect coins, avoid mines and to get to a treasure.
 Chasing a boat - a player steers a motorboat and tries not to let a shark catch it until time runs out.
 Jigsaw - a player's goal is to put together all pieces of a picture that can be bought in the Pet Shop.
 Race - a player uses a stylus to guide a shark through various obstacles.

Reception 
Lucas Thomas of IGN gave the game a rating of 7 out of 10, stating that the game would appeal to "any virtual pet fans out there", despite not containing any features that set the game apart from others in the genre.

References

External links
 101 Shark Pets's site at Teyon.com

2010 video games
DSiWare games
Nintendo DS-only games
Nintendo DS games
Virtual pet video games
Video games developed in Poland

Single-player video games
Teyon games